Deen-e-Illahi, which literally means "religion of God", may refer to:

 Din-e Ilahi, a syncretic religion founded by the Mughal emperor Akbar the Great in 1582 AD.
 Deen-e-Illahi, a controversial book on the topic of spirituality and mysticism by Riaz Ahmed Gohar Shahi published in 2000.